{{safesubst:#invoke:RfD||2=Break down of demonic structures|month = February
|day = 27
|year = 2023
|time = 16:06
|timestamp = 20230227160624

|content=
REDIRECT Classification of demons

}}